
Year 470 (CDLXX) was a common year starting on Thursday (link will display the full calendar) of the Julian calendar. At the time, it was known as the Year of the Consulship of Severus and Iordanes (or, less frequently, year 1223 Ab urbe condita). The denomination 470 for this year has been used since the early medieval period, when the Anno Domini calendar era became the prevalent method in Europe for naming years.

Events 
 By place 

 Roman Empire 
 Emperor Anthemius appeals to the Britons for military help against the Visigoths. A Breton force (12,000 men) under the Celtic leader Riothamus lands in Gaul, but is defeated by King Euric. He expands the Visigothic Kingdom further north, possibly as far as the Somme River.    
 The Santo Stefano Rotondo at Rome is consecrated (approximate date).

 Europe 
 Odoacer becomes the leader of the Germanic tribes (Herulic – Scirian foederati) in Northern Italy (approximate date).

 By topic 

 Religion 
 Mamertus, bishop of Vienne, introduces the Rogation days (a three days' procession involving prayer to invoke God's mercy).

Births 
 Buddhapālita, Indian Madhyamaka scholar (d. 550)
 Caesarius, bishop of Arles (approximate date)
 Dionysius Exiguus, inventor of the Anno Domini era (approximate date)
 Endelienta, Welsh princess and saint (approximate date)
 Ferreolus of Rodez, Roman senator (approximate date) 
 Finnian of Clonard, Irish monastic saint (d. 549)
 approximate date – Pope John I

Deaths 
 K'inich Popol Hol, king of the Maya city of Copán
 Romanus, Roman usurper in the West Roman Empire (executed)

References